Anthony Keane (June 30, 1928 – April 17, 2016) was an American fencer. He competed in the individual and team sabre events at the 1968 Summer Olympics.

References

External links
 

1928 births
2016 deaths
American male sabre fencers
Olympic fencers of the United States
Fencers at the 1968 Summer Olympics
Sportspeople from New York City
Pan American Games medalists in fencing
Pan American Games gold medalists for the United States
Pan American Games silver medalists for the United States
Fencers at the 1967 Pan American Games
Fencers at the 1971 Pan American Games